Peter, Baron Carmeliet (born 1959) is a Belgian physician and professor at the Katholieke Universiteit Leuven (Leuven, Belgium). He is also Adjunct Director of the VIB Vesalius Research Center, KU Leuven. Among his research interests are vasculogenesis, angiogenesis, and vascular endothelial growth factor (VEGF). In 2016, Carmeliet identified neuron-producing stem cells in the brain.

Carmeliet was elected a foreign member of the Royal Netherlands Academy of Arts and Sciences in 2017. By the number of citations, he is the most cited author of Nature Medicine.

Awards
 2002: Francqui Prize on Biological and Medical Sciences.
 2005: Interbrew-Baillet Latour Health Prize, together with Désiré Collen.
 2010: Ernst Jung Prize in Medicine.
 2018: Heineken Prize for Medicine

References

External links
 Peter Carmeliet, K.U. Leuven
 Peter Carmeliet, VIB

1959 births
Living people
Belgian cardiovascular researchers
Flemish scientists
KU Leuven alumni
Academic staff of KU Leuven
Members of the Royal Netherlands Academy of Arts and Sciences
Winners of the Heineken Prize